Gallos de Sancti Spíritus (English: Sancti Spíritus Roosters) is a baseball team in the Cuban National Series. The team won the series championship in 1978–79. The Gallos have advanced to the National Series semifinals in each of the past two seasons; 2004–05 and 2005–06.

Three Sancti Spíritus players were part of Cuba's team at the 2006 World Baseball Classic: Frederich Cepeda, Yulieski Gourriel and Eriel Sánchez.

Team stadiums
Every time a season starts, the team not only plays at José Antonio Huelga Stadium; their official stadium, but they also play  at other 7 stadiums:

 Genaro Melero Stadium – Jatibonico – The second most important besides José Antonio Huelga Stadium
 Mártires de Cabaiguán Stadium – Cabaiguán
 Luis Torres Stadium – Yaguajay
 Rolando Rodríguez Stadium – Trinidad
 Julio Antonio Mella Stadium – Taguasco
 Mártires de Río Zaza Stadium – La Sierpe
 Fidel Claro Stadium – Fomento

Roster

National Series MVPs
The following Sancti Spíritus players have won the National Series MVP award.
1994 Lourdes Gurriel
2001 Maels Rodríguez
2005 Yulieski Gurriel
2006 Yulieski Gurriel

Other notable players include:
 Jose Antonio Huelga (pitcher) known as El Heroe de Cartagena (The Hero of Cartagena)
 Modesto Verdura (pitcher)
 Miguel Rojas (second base)
 Owen Blandino (infield)
 Antonio Muñoz (first baseman)
 Roberto "El Cana" Ramos (pitcher)
 Yovani Aragón (pitcher)
 Ifreidi Coss (pitcher)
 José Raúl Delgado (catcher)
 Luis Enrique Gourriel (outfield)
 Miguel Hernández (pitcher)
 Osvaldo Oliva (infield)
 Rigoberto Rodríguez (shortstop)
 Ruperto Zamora (first base)
 Ángel Peña (pitcher)
 Maels Rodriguez (pitcher)
 Lázaro Martínez
 José Méndez
 Tony Simó (pitcher)

Sources

 www.RadioCoco.cu
 www.Escambray.cu

Baseball teams in Cuba
Sancti Spíritus
Baseball teams established in 1977
1977 establishments in Cuba